The molecular formula C6H14O may refer to:

 tert-Amyl methyl ether
 Diisopropyl ether
 Dimethylbutanols
 2,2-Dimethyl-1-butanol
 3,3-Dimethyl-1-butanol
 Dipropyl ether
 2-Ethyl-1-butanol
 Ethyl tert-butyl ether
 Hexanols
 1-Hexanol
 2-Hexanol
 3-Hexanol
 Methylpentanols
 2-Methyl-1-pentanol
 3-Methyl-1-pentanol
 4-Methyl-1-pentanol
 2-Methyl-2-pentanol
 3-Methyl-2-pentanol
 4-Methyl-2-pentanol
 2-Methyl-3-pentanol
 3-Methyl-3-pentanol
 Pinacolyl alcohol